A business-firm party, entrepreneurial party, or personal party is a type of political party that is centered on a charismatic political entrepreneur, most often created by that person to further their own interests.

Definition
It can be considered "the most extreme case of party personalization, consisting in the full control by an individual leader of the party he has himself created", in the words of political scientist Mauro  Calise. A business-firm party is modeled off the top-down organizational structure of a corporation as opposed to operating on the basis of internal party democracy. The party structure is related to the older type of elite party, but is even more strongly oligarchic in form, as the political entrepreneur maintains complete control of the party's assets. The entrepreneur controls all aspects of the party's platform and campaigning, plays the ultimate role in selecting candidates to run in elections, managing the party's resources, and wielding party discipline over other politicians in the party.

One characteristic distinguishing them from other parties is that the party organization is either dormant or limited outside of campaign seasons, and members are actively discouraged from becoming more involved in the party, therefore leading entrepreneurial parties to lack grassroots capacity. Entrepreneurial parties may have only one member, the party leader (as in the case of Party for Freedom or the Ticino League), or very few aside from politicians. The Party for Freedom initially did not recruit members out of fear of infiltration by the far-right; later, deputy leader Martin Bosma said that a party membership structure interfered with direct accountability between party leadership and voters. In a completely memberless business-firm party, volunteers, donors, and officeholders invest time, money, and their reputation (if the party is controversial) without any formal say in the party's operations.

Causes and effects
More monocratic systems of government, such as presidential systems, tend to encourage the formation of personal parties while the personalization of politics fuels the centralization of power. Entrepreneurial parties tend to be short-lived and rarely outlast their founders, except where the entrepreneur is successful in using his charisma to build a mass-membership party, as in the case of the Finns Party. Due to the lack of grassroots mobilization, leader-oriented parties may be less successful in local and regional politics, which are more distant from the charismatic leader, as occurred with ANO 2011 and Forza Italia.

Entrepreneurial parties are commonly far-right, nationalist, and/or populist. However, another tendency is not to have a firm ideology and instead closely follow opinion polls while being vague or self-contradictory on the party's standpoint. Tatiana Kostadinova and Barry Levitt argue that in a personalist party, "interactions between the leader and other politicians are driven mainly by loyalty to that leader rather than, for example, organizational rules, ideological affinities, or programmatic commitments". Business-firm parties are likely to emerge in new democracies and in situations of high electoral volatility. They may also result from declines in political participation and membership in traditional parties. In central Europe, entrepreneurial parties have formed as a type of state capture where state powers are used for private benefit. Entrepreneurial parties are especially common in Latin America.

Constitutionality
The Basic Law for the Federal Republic of Germany requires that political parties "conform to democratic principles" in their internal organization. When the Socialist Reich Party was banned in 1952, the Federal Constitutional Court's judgement stated: "If a party's internal organization does not correspond to democratic principles, one may generally conclude that the party seeks to impose upon the state the structural principles that it has implemented within its own organization." The constitutions of Portugal, Spain, Argentina, and Turkey include similar provisions. Israeli jurist  argues that non-democratically organized parties are undesirable because "There is a greater likelihood of the pursuit of nondemocratic goals in parties that have a nondemocratic structure."

Examples

Asia

Indonesia
Perindo (Hary Tanoesoedibjo)

Israel
Hayamin Hahadash, Yamina (Naftali Bennett)
Kachol Lavan, Israel Resilience Party, Hamachane Hamamlachti (Benny Gantz)
Yesh Atid (Yair Lapid)
Yisrael Beiteinu (Avigdor Lieberman)
Kulanu (Moshe Kahlon)
Hatnua (Tzipi Livni)

Thailand
Thai Rak Thai Party  (Thaksin Shinawatra)

Turkey
Rights and Equality Party
Young Party

Africa

Lesotho
Revolution for Prosperity under Sam Matekane's leadership

Europe

Austria
Freedom Party of Austria under Jörg Haider's leadership
Team Stronach for Austria (Frank Stronach)

Belgium
Lijst Dedecker (Jean-Marie Dedecker)

Czech Republic
Public Affairs (Vít Bárta)
ANO 2011 (Andrej Babiš)
Dawn of Direct Democracy (Tomio Okamura)
Freedom and Direct Democracy (Okamura)

Finland
Finns Party

France
National Rally

Hungary
Fidesz (Viktor Orbán)

Italy
Forza Italia (Silvio Berlusconi)
Popolo della Libertà (Berlusconi)
Italy of Values (Antonio Di Pietro)

Lithuania
Labour Party

Netherlands
Pim Fortuyn List
Party for Freedom (Geert Wilders)

Norway
Progress Party (Anders Lange)

Poland
Modern (Ryszard Petru)
Kukiz'15 (Paweł Kukiz)
Palikot Movement (Janusz Palikot)

Romania
People's Party – Dan Diaconescu
Serbia

 Strength of Serbia Movement

Slovakia
We Are Family (Boris Kollár)
Ordinary People and Independent Personalities (Igor Matovič)

Spain
Union of the Democratic Centre (Adolfo Suárez)

Switzerland
Ticino League (Giuliano Bignasca)

Oceania

Australia

Tasmanian Independent Senator Brian Harradine Group (Brian Harradine)
John Madigan's Manufacturing and Farming Party
Katter's Australian Party (Bob Katter)
Palmer United Party (Clive Palmer)
Glenn Lazarus Team (Glenn Lazarus)
Jacqui Lambie Network (Jacqui Lambie)

South America

Peru
Cambio 90 (Alberto Fujimori)
Sí Cumple (Fujimori)
Peru 2000 (Fujimori)

See also
Authoritarian leadership style
Trumpism

References

Further reading

Ethically disputed political practices
Types of political parties